Putulik, formerly Hat Island, is a small (about ) uninhabited island located in the Kitikmeot of Nunavut, Canada. The Requisite Channel separates the island from Amundsen Island, the larger of the Nordenskiöld Islands.

Hat Island (CAM-B) is a former Distant Early Warning Line and current North Warning System sites The Canadian government's Contaminated Sites directorate has determined Hat Island to be a contaminated site in need of future remediation.

Another smaller Hat Island is also in Nunavut.

References 

Uninhabited islands of Kitikmeot Region
Former populated places in the Kitikmeot Region